Kristian Keinhorst is a German former rugby league footballer who played for the German national team.

Career
He has made the most appearances of any German player (15). He is the brother of Leeds Rhinos player, Jimmy Keinhorst and has two other brothers Nick and Markus. Together they set the world record for the most siblings to play in an international match (4).

In 2015 he played his last international match, against Spain.

References

Year of birth missing (living people)
Living people
English people of German descent
English rugby league players
Germany national rugby league team players
Rugby league halfbacks
Rugby league players from Yorkshire